F2B may refer to:

  FAI CLASS F2B -  Control Line Aerobatic  Model Aircraft.
 Boeing F2B, an aircraft
 Fade to Black (video game)
 First two blocks, in speedcubing
 Bristol F.2 Fighter, a Great War British aircraft
 Mitsubishi F-2, a Japanese fighter aircraft